Hickory Municipal Building is a historic municipal building located at Hickory, Catawba County, North Carolina. It was built in 1920–1921, and is a two-story brick building in the Classical Revival style. It has a three-story auditorium.  The front facade features a one-story limestone portico, protecting the center entrance. In 1977, the city administrative offices were relocated to the new city hall.  It houses the Hickory Community Theatre.

It was listed on the National Register of Historic Places in 2000.

References

Hickory, North Carolina
City and town halls on the National Register of Historic Places in North Carolina
Government buildings completed in 1921
Neoclassical architecture in North Carolina
Buildings and structures in Catawba County, North Carolina
National Register of Historic Places in Catawba County, North Carolina
City and town halls in North Carolina